Paul-Marie Cao Ðinh Thuyên (7 January 1927 – 29 August 2022) was a Roman Catholic prelate from Vietnam.

Cao Ðihn Thuyên was born in Vietnam and was ordained to the priesthood in 1960. He served as coadjutor bishop and diocese bishop of the Roman Catholic Diocese of Vinh from 1992 until his retirement in 2010.

References

1927 births
2022 deaths
Vietnamese Roman Catholic bishops
20th-century Roman Catholic bishops in Vietnam
21st-century Roman Catholic bishops in Vietnam
Bishops appointed by Pope John Paul II
People from Nghệ An province